Marianne Bronner is a developmental biologist who currently serves as Edward B. Lewis Professor of Biology and an Executive Officer for Neurobiology at the California Institute of Technology. She has made great contributions to the field of developmental biology with her research on the neural crest. Her research focuses on studying the cellular events behind the migration, differentiation, and formation of neural crest cells. She currently directs her own laboratory at the California Institute of Technology called the Bronner Laboratory and has over 280 publications.

Early years

At the age of 4, Bronner’s family escaped from Hungary to seek a better life in a different country. They left the country and managed to stay in Austria for 6 months before moving to the United States. Both of her parents were holocaust survivors and have had a strong influence on Bronner’s personality.

Education and career

Bronner attended Brown University for her undergraduate studies. Early on in her time at Brown University she was there she was unsure as to what type of scientific field she wanted to become involved with. She could not decide whether or not to pursue physics, chemistry or biology so she decided to study biophysics which encompasses all of these sciences. After Bronner graduated from Brown University, she decided to apply to the biophysics graduate school program at Johns Hopkins University. Once there she felt the need to understand biology more and decided to take an undergraduate course in developmental biology. It was that course which caused Bronner to realize her passion for developmental biology. Bronner then began to learn about the work of Nicole Le Douarin which caused her to become fascinated with the properties of the neural crest.

Once Bronner graduated from Johns Hopkins University with her Ph.D. she accepted a non-tenure job position at the University of California, Irvine. Once there, she was able to obtain a tenure-track position with the help of some of her colleagues from the Developmental Biology Center. Bronner spent 16 years at the University of California, Irvine and eventually became the associate director of the Developmental Biology Center.
In 1996 Bronner left the University of California, Irvine and moved her laboratory to the California Institute of Technology. In 2001 Bronner was able to become the Chair of the Faculty at Caltech and was the first woman ever to hold that position. She held that position for two years. Bronner served as co-director of the Embryology course at the Marine Biological Laboratory from 1997 to 2001.

The Bronner Laboratory

Marianne Bronner has been directing a laboratory at Caltech since she first arrived at the university. The lab focuses most of its research on how neural crest cells arise and the factors involving their migration from the neural tube to different positions in the embryo in addition to the evolution of these cells. The current projects in the laboratory are diverse and focus on different aspect of the neural crest. One project focuses on characterizing the structures involved with neural crest cell movements. Another project in the lab focuses on comparing the mechanisms behind neural crest invasive behavior and the mechanisms that allow for adult derivatives to become migratory and invasive.

Awards and honors
Edwin G. Conklin Medal from the Society for Developmental Biology (2013) 
Women in Cell Biology Senior Leadership Award (2012) 
American Academy of Arts & Science, Fellow (2009)
BUSAC Award for Excellence in Teaching (2001 & 2005)
Javits Neuroscience Investigator Award from the National Institute Of Neurological Disorders And Stroke (2002-2009) 
ASCIT Award for Excellence in Teaching (1997 & 1998)
Distinguished Research Award from the University of California, Irvine (1994)

Professional societies
International Society for Differentiation, President (2013-2014)
International Society for Developmental Biology, Secretary (2010-2013)
Gordon Research Conferences, Board of Directors (2006-2013), Chair (2012)
Society for Developmental Biology, President (2009)
Sontag Foundation, Scientific Advisory Board Member (2006–present)
American Society for Cell Biology, Council Member (1994-1997)

Selected publications
Rogers CD, Saxena A, Bronner ME. Sip1 mediates an E-cadherin-to-N-cadherin switch during cranial neural crest EMT. J. Cell Biol. 2013 Dec 9;203(5):835-47. doi: 10.1083/jcb.201305050. Epub 2013 Dec 2.
Barembaum, M. and Bronner, M. E. (2013) Identification and dissection of a key enhancer mediating cranial neural crest specific expression of transcription factor, Ets-1.  Dev. Biol. (in press).
Hochgreb-Hägele, T. and Bronner, M.E. (2013) Zebrafish stem/progenitor factor msi2b exhibits two phases of activity mediated by different splice variants. Stem Cells (in press).
Simões-Costa M, Bronner ME. (2013) Insights into neural crest development and evolution from genommic analysis.  Genome Res. 23, 1069-80
Saxena, A., Peng, B. and Bronner, M.E. (2013) Sox10-dependent neural crest origin for olfactory microvillous neurons.  eLife e00336.
Smith, J., et al., (2013) Sequencing of the sea lamprey (Petromyzon marinus) genome provides insights into vertebrate evolution.   Nat Genet. 45, 415-21.
Simões-Costa, M.*, McKeown, S.*, Tan-Cabugoa, J., Sauka-Spengler, T. and Bronner, M.E. (2012) Dynamic and differential regulation of stem cell factor FoxD3 in the neural crest is encrypted in the genome PLoS. Genetics e1003142.
Green SA, Bronner ME. (2012) Gene duplication and the early evolution of neural crest development.  Semin Cell Dev Biol. S1084-9521(12)00230-3
Hu, N., Strobl-Mazzulla, P., Sauka-Spengler,T., Bronner,M.E. (2012) DNA methyltransferase3A as a molecular switch mediating the neural tube to neural crest fate transition. Genes and Development 26, 2380-5.

References

Living people
Year of birth missing (living people)
Developmental biologists
Brown University alumni
Johns Hopkins University alumni
California Institute of Technology people
Hungarian emigrants to the United States
American women biologists
20th-century American biologists
20th-century American women scientists
21st-century American biologists
21st-century American women scientists